Lina Rosales (born 27 December 1928) is a Spanish retired film and television actress.

Selected filmography
 A Tale of Two Villages (1951)
 Under the Sky of Spain (1953)
 The Portico of Glory (1953)
 Cursed Mountain (1954)
 Per un pugno nell'occhio (1965)
 Pedrito de Andía's New Life (1965)

References

Bibliography 
 Monserrat Claveras Pérez. La Pasión de Cristo en el cine. Encuentro, 2011.

External links 
 

1928 births
Living people
Spanish film actresses
Spanish television actresses
People from Madrid